Vadim Aleksandrovich Belokhonov (born 12 July 1973) is a former Russian professional football player.

Club career
He made his Russian Football National League debut for FC Metallurg Krasnoyarsk  on 9 May 1993 in a game against FC Lokomotiv Chita.

External links
 

1973 births
Living people
People from Zelenogorsk, Krasnoyarsk Krai
Russian footballers
FC Tom Tomsk players
FC Sibir Novosibirsk players
FC Oryol players
Association football midfielders
FC Yenisey Krasnoyarsk players
FC Novokuznetsk players
Sportspeople from Krasnoyarsk Krai